Paul Bulluss (born 23 January 1970) is a former Australian rules footballer who played with Richmond in the Australian Football League (AFL) during the 1990s.

Bulluss was picked up from Woodville-West Torrens with the 52nd pick of the 1992 AFL draft. He played 19 games in his debut season and in 1995 participated in Richmond's finals series. A key defender, he also played for South Australia in their State of Origin match against Victoria at the MCG in 1995.

After leaving Richmond at the end of the 1998 season he joined Balywn in the Southern Football League with whom he won a premiership. Bullus was named in the Woodville-West Torrens 'Team of the Decade'.

References

1970 births
Richmond Football Club players
Woodville-West Torrens Football Club players
South Australian State of Origin players
Living people
Australian rules footballers from South Australia